The 1993 Japanese Grand Prix (formally the XIX Fuji Television Japanese Grand Prix) was a Formula One motor race held at Suzuka on 24 October 1993. It was the fifteenth race of the 1993 Formula One World Championship.

The 53-lap race was won by Ayrton Senna, driving a McLaren-Ford, after he started from second position. Alain Prost finished second in a Williams-Renault, having started from pole position, while Senna's teammate Mika Häkkinen came third, achieving his first podium finish.

Jordan drivers Rubens Barrichello and Eddie Irvine (the latter making his F1 debut) scored their first points by finishing fifth and sixth respectively. Irvine was subsequently punched by Senna for unlapping himself during the race. Two other drivers made their F1 debuts at this race, Jean-Marc Gounon and Toshio Suzuki. Only 24 cars were entered, following the withdrawal of the BMS Scuderia Italia team from F1 in the run-up to the race.

Report

Qualifying
Prost took pole (the last of his career) ahead of Senna, Häkkinen, Schumacher, Berger and Hill.

Race
At the start, Senna got ahead of Prost while Berger took Schumacher. Eddie Irvine, the fifth occupant of the second Jordan this year, then got by both Schumacher and Hill. Hill briefly passed Schumacher in the esses but Schumacher retook the position. The order was: Senna, Prost, Häkkinen, Berger, Irvine and Schumacher. Schumacher would pass Irvine on lap 2 with Hill getting ahead two laps later.

Schumacher and Hill then closed in on Berger. At the end of lap 9, the three came out of the final chicane nose to tail and Hill passed Schumacher on the start/finish straight to take 5th place away. On lap 11, Hill got a run on Berger coming out of the 130R and Berger took the inside line going into the chicane. Hill tried to pass on the outside but was not able to complete the move. Schumacher, having stayed to the inside, couldn't stop fast enough as Hill turned in behind Berger and hit Hill's right rear wheel, damaging his left front suspension and putting himself out. Hill was able to keep going and inherited 4th on the next lap when Berger came in for tyres.

Meanwhile, Prost inherited the lead when Senna pitted for tyres. Shortly after it began to rain, which was an advantage for Prost and other drivers who had not yet stopped for tyres since they would have to make one less stop. Senna began to catch Prost as the track got wetter and on lap 21, as the rain intensified, Senna passed Prost on the approach to the Spoon curve. At the end of the lap, Senna was two seconds in front and the two both pitted for wets. Senna pulled away rapidly in the wet conditions, building over a 30-second lead by lap 27. Prost then went off at the first corner but was able to rejoin without losing time to Senna, who was delayed by traffic. The rain then stopped and drivers began coming in for slick tyres as the track began to dry. Hill rejoined after his pit stop nearly a lap down to Senna, who was still on wets. Unable to lap Hill, Senna was re-passed by Irvine, who had been lapped but was chasing Hill for 4th position. Irvine, who was also still on wets, challenged Hill in the first corner but was not able to make the pass stick while Senna waited behind to lap the pair. Senna lost 15 seconds to Prost by the time he forced his way back past Irvine and Hill let him through. At the end of lap 42, after he and Prost had made their pit stops for slicks, Senna's lead was back up to 24 seconds. With only 12 laps remaining, Prost never challenged after that and settled for second. Häkkinen's 3rd place was his first podium finish.

Behind, Barrichello had got Irvine during the stops for wets and then Berger's engine failed on lap 41. With 4 laps to go and battling with Derek Warwick for 6th, Irvine ran into the back of Warwick under braking on the approach to the chicane and knocked him out of the race. Irvine was able to continue and finish with a point in his first grand prix. Irvine's debut was slightly marred in a post-race altercation with Ayrton Senna who punched him when a discussion between the pair got heated. This earned Senna a suspended two-race ban.

Senna won ahead of Prost, Häkkinen, Hill, Barrichello and Irvine. Fastest lap of the race was set by Prost, the last of his career.

Classification

Qualifying

Race

Championship standings after the race
 Bold text indicates World Champions.

Drivers' Championship standings

Constructors' Championship standings

References 

Japanese Grand Prix
Japanese Grand Prix
Grand Prix
Japanese Grand Prix